The following is a list of clubs who have played in the Danish Superliga at any time since its formation in 1991 to the current season. Teams playing in the 2021–22 Danish Superliga season are indicated in bold. A total of 32 teams have played in the Danish Superliga.

All statistics here refer to time in the Danish Superliga only, with the exception of 'Most recent finish' which refers to all levels of play, and 'Last promotion' which refers to the club's last promotion from the second tier of Danish football.

Notes

Clubs